Bridge in Yardley Borough was a historic stone arch bridge located at Scammells Corner in Yardley, Bucks County, Pennsylvania.  It had a single span, 13 feet long, and was constructed in 1889.  It was constructed of coursed rubble masonry.

It was listed on the National Register of Historic Places in 1988. Sometime after listing, the bridge was replaced with a concrete bridge span.

References 
 

Road bridges on the National Register of Historic Places in Pennsylvania
Bridges completed in 1889
Bridges in Bucks County, Pennsylvania
National Register of Historic Places in Bucks County, Pennsylvania
Arch bridges in the United States
Concrete bridges in the United States